Chowdavaram OW is a small village in Vemsoor mandal, Khammam district, Telangana, India.

Villages in Khammam district